Anopina ainslieana is a moth of the family Tortricidae. It is found in the southern United States in New Mexico and Colorado.

The length of the forewings is 5.5–7 mm. The ground colour of the forewings is brownish ochreous, suffused with dark brown and orange yellow, or with a similar, more or less distinct striation. The hindwings are fuscous, dark sprinkled.

References

Moths described in 1962
ainslieana
Moths of North America